The Egypt 2000 Party is a small Egyptian political party with a membership of around 165 members. The party nominated its head Dr. Fawzy Khalil Ghazal to run for Egypt's first ever multi-candidate presidential elections in 2005.

Goals
Self-construction of Egyptian society.
Rejection of the western values of globalization.

Platform
The party platform calls for:
Respect of the Arabic language as a main trait of Egyptian society.
National unity and social peace.
Independence of the mass media.
Party pluralism.
Boosting the political and social role of the Egyptian youth & women.

External links
Political Parties at sis.gov.eg

2001 establishments in Egypt
Political parties established in 2001
Political parties in Egypt